Marty Raybon (born December 8, 1959) is an American country music artist. He is known primarily for his role as the lead singer of the country band Shenandoah, a role which he held from 1985 to 1997, until he rejoined the band in 2014. He recorded his first solo album, Marty Raybon, in 1995 on Sparrow Records. Before leaving Shenandoah in 1997, he and his brother Tim formed a duo known as the Raybon Brothers, which had crossover success that year with the hit single "Butterfly Kisses".

The Raybon Brothers split up in 1997, and Marty Raybon resumed his career as a solo artist. A second self-titled album was released in 2000, followed by 2003's Full Circle. 2006 saw the release of When the Sand Runs Out, which included the single "Shenandoah Saturday Night".

Discography

Albums

Singles

Music videos

References

External links
Official website

1959 births
Singer-songwriters from Florida
American country singer-songwriters
Living people
People from Sanford, Florida
Shenandoah (band) members
Country musicians from Florida